Mississippi Gulf Coast Community College (MGCCC) is a public community college with its main campus in Perkinston, Mississippi.  It was founded as Harrison County Agricultural High School in 1912.  MGCCC has three campuses and six centers: The main campus in Perkinston; the Jackson County Campus is in Gautier; the Harrison County Campus is in Gulfport; with the George County Center in Lucedale; the West Harrison County Center in Long Beach; the Advanced Manufacturing & Technology Center in Gulfport; the Keesler Center at Keesler Air Force Base in Biloxi; the Naval Construction Battalion Center in Gulfport; and the Bryant Center at Tradition in Harrison County.

MGCCC also offers a Community Campus that provides workforce education programs, onsite and online, to south Mississippi residents and employers.

The college's athletic teams are known as the Bulldogs. They compete in the  Mississippi Association of Community & Junior Colleges in football, basketball, baseball, soccer, softball, golf and tennis. MGCCC won the National Junior College Athletic Association Football Championship in 1971 and 1984, was co-national champion in 2007, and won outright again in 2019. The football team also shared the 1948 Williamson Football Rating Bureau national championship with Compton Junior College. The men's golf team won the NJCAA Division II Men's Golf Championship in 2018 and Colin Troxler won an individual national championship in 2017. The women's basketball team won the Association for Intercollegiate Athletics for Women Junior College national championship in 1973.

History 

MGCCC began as the Harrison County Agricultural High School on September 17, 1911. Four years later, north Harrison County became Stone County, and both counties continued to support the school. On September 14, 1925, with the support of Jackson County, Harrison-Stone-Jackson Agricultural High School and Junior College began offering its first year of Junior College work. George County then added its support in 1942, and the institution took the name of Perkinston Junior College.

In 1962, the Mississippi Gulf Coast Junior College District was formed, and three years later, Mississippi Gulf Coast Junior College added the Jefferson Davis and Jackson County campuses. Between 1965 and 1985, 4 new centers were opened. The college name was changed to Mississippi Gulf Coast Community College on October 1, 1987. In 1996, the Community Campus, a campus without walls, was added as a fourth campus.

In 2006, President George W. Bush became the first sitting President to speak at a community college graduation, when he spoke at Mississippi Gulf Coast Community College.

On July 22, 2020, the Board of Trustees for MGCCC voted to change the name of the Jefferson Davis campus to the Harrison County campus, as people in Mississippi and in the US called for removal of symbols and names that tend to honor the Confederate States of America.

Notable alumni

Gallery

See also 
Harrison Hall (Mississippi Gulf Coast Community College)

References

External links 
Official website

Gulfport–Biloxi metropolitan area
Pascagoula metropolitan area
Educational institutions established in 1925
Universities and colleges accredited by the Southern Association of Colleges and Schools
Education in Stone County, Mississippi
Education in Jackson County, Mississippi
Education in Jefferson Davis County, Mississippi
Education in George County, Mississippi
Education in Harrison County, Mississippi
Buildings and structures in Stone County, Mississippi
Community colleges in Mississippi
NJCAA athletics
1925 establishments in Mississippi